Centro Peruano de Estudios Sociales (Peruvian Center for Social Studies) is a civil society organization specializing in rural development based in Peru.

The CEPES was founded in 1976. Its muti-disciplinary staff come from backgrounds which include economics, law, social science and communication and the information sciences.

CEPES conducts research and disseminates information on rural development which seeks to contribute to the inclusion of peasants and small farmers in the process of modernization and democratization of rural society and economy, through the generation of proposals and the development of political influence, with a strong commitment to a national, decentralized, and equitable democratic development.

Its activities include creating and disseminating information and knowledge through publications, magazines, electronic bulletins and radio broadcasts. Its publications include:

Debate Agrario (a research journal)
La Revista Agraria (a magazine focusing on agrarian and rural development issues)
Informativo Legal Agrario (a legal review published three times a year)
Notiagro, an online daily round-up of agrarian and rural news
electronic bulletins on the coffee-growing, livestock-farming and milk-producing industries in Peru.

The CEPES website is in Spanish and includes agrarian and rural statistics; rural and agrarian news; audio from radio broadcasts; and downloadable articles from La Revista Agraria and Debate Agrario. The Centre is in Lima.

External links
  CEPES website

Organizations established in 1976
Research institutes in Peru
Rural community development